Simao Pedro Goncalves de Figueiredo Costa (born 7 September 1975) is a Portuguese retired footballer who played as a midfielder.

Club career
He played mainly for Portuguese football clubs, as well as for Daejeon Citizen in South Korean in 2001.

References

External links
 
 Simao Costa Profile

1974 births
Living people
K League 1 players
Daejeon Hana Citizen FC players
Portuguese expatriate footballers
Expatriate footballers in South Korea
Portuguese expatriate sportspeople in South Korea
Association football midfielders
Portuguese footballers